The Opel Astra is a compact car/small family car (C-segment) developed and produced by the German automaker Opel since 1991, currently at its sixth generation. It was first launched in September 1991 as a direct replacement to the Opel Kadett. , the car slots between the smaller Corsa supermini and the larger Insignia large family car.

Initially, the Astra was available in hatchback, saloon, and estate (station wagon; known as the Astra Caravan, later the Sports Tourer) forms. A panel van (sedan delivery; Astravan) and a convertible (Astra Cabrio) also appeared in the early 1990s. These body styles were later followed by a coupé (the Astra GTC) in 2004, and the sporty Astra OPC appeared in 2005. The Twin Top retractable hardtop convertible replaced the soft top convertible in 2006, while the Caravan was renamed to Astra Sports Tourer since 2009.

The Astra is branded the Vauxhall Astra in the United Kingdom. It was rebadged and sold as the Saturn Astra in North America between 2008 and 2009, as the Buick Excelle XT from 2009 until 2015 and as the Buick Verano/Hatchback GS in China from 2015 until 2021. The Holden Astra was discontinued in Australia and New Zealand in 2009, and was replaced by the locally assembled Holden Cruze. It briefly returned to the Australian market in 2012, for the first time badged as an Opel, but was discontinued after Opel withdrew from the country a year later. In 2015, Opel reintroduced the Astra GTC and Astra VXR to Australia and New Zealand in 2015, again bearing the Holden badge. Between 2017 and 2019, the Astra nameplate was also used for the Holden version of the Cruze sedan.

After Opel was sold by General Motors to PSA Group, the Astra K continued to be produced under license until it was replaced by the Astra L. Developed by PSA Group, the Astra L was released after the merger of the company to form Stellantis.

Naming convention
The Astra nameplate originates from Vauxhall, which had manufactured and marketed earlier generations of the Opel Kadett (the Kadett D (1979–1984) and Kadett E (1984–1991)) as the Vauxhall Astra. Subsequent GM Europe policy standardised model nomenclature in the early 1990s, whereby model names were the same in all markets regardless of the marque they were sold under.

As of 2021, there have been six generations of the Astra (or eleven generations of the Kadett/Astra family as a whole).  In a fashion typical for Opel, they are designated with subsequent letters of the Latin alphabet. Opel's official convention is that the Astra is a logical continuation of the Kadett lineage, thus, the first generation of Opel Astra as the Astra F (the last Opel Kadett was the Kadett E). The usual convention would have started with Astra A, if the Astra had been considered a separate model. Models sold as Vauxhall, Holden, or Chevrolet have different generation designations reflecting the history of those nameplates in their home markets and their naming conventions.

Astra F (T92; 1992)

The Astra F debuted in September 1991. With the Kadett E's successor, Opel adopted the Astra nameplate, which was already used by Vauxhall for the Kadett D and E (see Vauxhall Astra). It was offered as a three- or five-door hatchback, a saloon (sedan), and an estate (wagon) known as the Caravan and available with five doors only, bringing Opel's run of three-door wagons to an end at long last. A cabriolet was also offered, designed, and built by Bertone in Italy. While the Astra F finished production in Germany in 1998, Polish-built Astras remained on offer in Central and Eastern Europe, as well as Turkey, with the name Opel Astra Classic from 1998 to 2002.

The Astra F consisted of two main revisions and was revised in 1995, with the launch of Opel's new Ecotec engine.

It also featured a sports body kit and widened front seats in the interior. However, this was substituted in 1995 and was renamed as SPORT, although only a limited number were produced and the body kit was removed also and it could be selected with the lower-powered, but more modern 'Ecotec' version, the X20XEV (136 hp, 100 kW) parallel with the C20XE. In Europe from 1994 all Astra models were offered with the 2.0 L 16V Ecotec X20XEV parallel with the 2.0 L 8V (C20NE) engine, but the three-door and station wagon models could be selected with the 151 hp (110 kW) C20XE engine. Some Astra models had a 1.6 L engine with 83 hp.

After the Astra F was replaced by the new generation Astra G in 1998, the so-called "REDTOP" C20XE engine was also taken out of production.

Gallery

South Africa and the 200t S
The model was also launched in South Africa in 1991, where it was produced under licence by Delta. The "Kadett" name was retained for the hatchback Astras until 1999. The sedan and station wagon models were offered under the Astra name. The Kadett and Astra in South Africa won the title of 'Car of the Year' in two consecutive years (1994 and 1995) even though they were versions of the same car. South African nomenclature was denoted in centilitres, so the Astra and Kadett ranges featured 140, 160i, 180i and 200i models. The South African lineup included a unique variant with a turbocharged C20LET engine called the Opel Kadett 200t S. The 200t S was built by Delta Motor Corporation and faster than the then-current BMW M3 in a quarter-mile drag race. The "t" stands for the turbocharger. The engine was sourced from the 4x4 Opel Calibra and Opel Vectra and converted from a six-speed, four-wheel drive transmission (Getrag F28) to front-wheel drive only.

Other markets
The Opel Astra also became available in Australasia badged as a Holden, first in New Zealand in 1995, and then Australia in 1996. These models were imported from the UK. The Holden Astra name had previously been used on rebadged Nissan Pulsar models from 1984 to 1989.

The Opel Astra's first generation was exported to Brazil from December 1994 as the Chevrolet Astra, possibly because of a lowering of import tariffs. General Motors do Brasil sent the 2.0-litre, 115 bhp engines to Belgium, whence the completed cars took their way to Brazil. In February 1996 the Brazilian government again changed the import tariff, from 20 to 70% - making the car prohibitively expensive and leading to its cancellation after just over a year on the market. Instead, the locally built Kadett was updated. The second-generation Astra was manufactured in Brazil.

Beginning in March 1995, the Astra sedan was assembled in Indonesia where it was marketed as the Opel Optima. The renaming was done as the name was already used by Astra International, a local automotive company and an assembler/distributor of several competing car brands. In India the Opel Astra was assembled for the local market in a joint venture with the Birla Companies, beginning in 1996. Indian production ended in 2002.

The first-generation Chevrolet Astra in Brazil had a Vauxhall-style front grille featuring a "V", containing the Chevrolet badge.

Awards
 1992 – Semperit Irish Car of the Year
 1994 and 1995 – South African Car of the Year

Engines

Astra G (T98; 1998)

Opel launched the Astra K at the Frankfurt Motor Show in September 2015 for the 2016 model year.

The Astra K is smaller (5 cm), and lighter (up to 200 kg) compared to Astra J. Although it is smaller on the outside, Opel claims it is bigger on the inside than the previous Astra J. Depending on the model and trim level it is up to 200 kilograms - at the very least 120 kilograms - lighter than its predecessor. The completely new vehicle architecture plays a major role in the weight reduction. Every component was checked for compact design and lightweight materials. The bodyshell weight alone was reduced by 20 percent from 357 to 280 kilograms. Additional, chassis-related measures resulted in another 50 kilograms of weight reduction; these include high-strength and ultra-high-strength low-weight steels, compact subframes as well as weight reductions to the front and rear axle. Rear suspension is torsion beam (only with Watts linkage on top engines), and MacPherson struts at the front.

Available engines are 1.0 3-cylinder, 1.4 4-cylinder petrol engines and 1.6-litre diesels. It will be available with new full-LED front light techniques, A screen in the dash which connect to Android or iPhone comes as standard. This system is already available, in both the Corsa E and Adam.

Engines
Engines are available with the 5-speed or 6-speed manual transmission, and the newly developed 5-speed EasyTronic 3.0 automated manual, which is only available for the 1.0T SIDI engine. The only other available automatic transmission, at the beginning of production, is the 6-speed with active select mode, which can be ordered in late 2015, for the 1.4 SIDI Turbo with 150 PS, and 1.6 CDTI with 136 PS. Buyers can choose the Start/Stop system for all engines as an extra feature, except the 1.0T which will have system as standard.

All engines are new and recently developed by Opel - 1.0T SIDI, 1.4T SIDI (which sees its debut in the Astra K in 2015) and the naturally aspirated version of it (which will be available later in 2015), and the so-called "Whisper diesel" 1.6 CDTI. All turbocharged petrol engines use the Direct Injection Fuel system.

Opel are offering the ecoFLEX range for 1.0T, 1.4T and 1.6 CDTI engines which have same amount of power, but less CO2-emissions (g/km) and lower fuel consumption. The entire ecoFLEX range have Start/Stop as standard, low rolling resistance tyres and aerodynamic tweaks for reduced drag for lower CO2-emissions.

In 2019 Opel announced the move to the new GM E-Turbo 1.2-liter, "1.4-liter" (actually a 1.3-liter) three-cylinder gasoline engines, and 1.5-liter three-cylinder diesels.

Facelift 
A facelift of Opel Astra K released around the summer of 2019. Changes were minimal, both inside and outside; however the facelifted Astra sports a new front grille, new rear lights, as well as a new windscreen wiper mechanism, where both wipers are individually controlled as opposed to a linked setup as before.

The last Astra to be produced in Ellesmere Port rolled off the assembly line on April 6, 2022.
The last Astra to be produced in Gliwice factory rolled off the assembly line on November 30, 2021.

Astra L (C02; 2021)

The sixth generation Astra was unveiled on 13 July 2021 and it went on sale on 12 November 2021. Launched ten months after the merger of FCA and PSA to form Stellantis, the vehicle has been offered as a hybrid for the first time and will unveil a 180-horsepower engine. The 225 horsepower version, taken from the Peugeot 508 and Peugeot 3008, will also be available on the GT version.

Electric

Safety

Euro NCAP
The Astra in its standard European configuration received 4 stars from Euro NCAP in 2022.

Motorsport

An Astra won the Andros Trophy for three consecutive years starting in 2000.

The Astra Coupé in BTC-T form was dominant in the British Touring Car Championship from 2001 until 2004, and it continued to compete in the series until 2006.

An Astra was used in the 1994 Super Tourenwagen Cup season. In 2002, 2003 and 2006, three different drivers were European Rallycross Champions in the Division 2 driving Astras. The 2003, 2004, 2006, 2007 and 2008 runners-up also raced in that car. Christian Ledesma was 2004 TC 2000 champion with an Astra and Matías Rossi took that title in 2006 and 2007.

A rally version of the Astra was built to the FIA 2-Litre World Rally Cup. The car finished second in class on the 1998 Rally of Great Britain, and claimed the British Rally Championship for manufacturers in 2000.

The Astra has been used in the shape of silhouette racing cars as well. It was featured in the Deutsche Tourenwagen Masters from 2000 to 2003 (Manuel Reuter was runner-up in 2000) and overall winner of the 2003 Nürburgring 24h race and the Stock Car Brasil from 2004 to 2008 (Giuliano Losacco won the tournament in 2004 and 2005). In 2009, the Astra G body was replaced Stock Car Brasil by a Vectra, which is in fact the same as the Astra H.

The car has also been raced in the Russian Touring Car Championship, the 2004 European Touring Car Championship season, the 2006 Swedish Touring Car Championship season, the 2008 European Touring Car Cup and the 2013 European Rallycross Championship season.

Latin American models (1994–2011)

Chevrolet Astra

The Chevrolet Astra is the same vehicle as the Opel Astra, but with some mechanical differences.
In Brazil, Chevrolet Astra as launched at 1994 as 1995 model only in 5-door hatchback and station wagon body styles. The plan was to replace the Chevrolet Kadett, an Opel Kadett E built locally, but an increase in taxes for import cars (from 35 to 70 percent) made General Motors of Brazil stop importing the model for the 1996 model year. The Chevrolet Astra only returned in 1998, in second generation and built locally. Initially, it only came in 3-door hatchback and 4-door sedan body styles, and GL and GLS trim levels.

In 2003 the Astra range received an exterior facelift, with a 5-door hatchback completing the range. The 1.8 liter engine was discontinued, with a 2.0 liter flexfuel (ethanol and gasoline) being launched for the 2004 model year. A GSI 2.0 16V was launched with the 2003 facelift and produced until 2005. The range did not change much until its discontinuation in 2011, being in effect replaced by the Chevrolet Sonic and Cobalt.

Chile
In Chile, the Astra was sold under the Opel brand until 1997 (replacing the Kadett); beginning in 1999 the second generation was imported from Brazil under the Chevrolet brand. The third generation was again imported from Europe in and in 2017 it returned to be sold under Opel brand.

Chevrolet Astra OPC and GSi

Chevrolet Vectra (Brazil)
The Chevrolet Vectra is a rebadged version of the Opel Astra H, sold in Brazil and Argentina between 2006 and 2011. It shared the powertrain and the platform with the Astra G, except when equipped with the 2.4 engine, and it was inserted above the Astra in both markets. It was replaced by the flagship versions of the Chevrolet Cruze.

Notes

References

External links

Official Opel Astra website (Ireland)
Glossary of Technology and Innovations pertaining to the Opel Astra TwinTop

Euro NCAP small family cars
Front-wheel-drive vehicles
Astra
Compact cars
Convertibles
Coupés
Cars of Germany
Hardtop convertibles
Hot hatches
Sedans
Station wagons
Police vehicles
2000s cars
2010s cars
Cars introduced in 1991
Touring cars
Bertone vehicles
Articles containing video clips

nah:Opel Astra F